Elizabeth Deane is a writer, producer and director of documentary films for PBS, specializing in American history. She is based primarily at WGBH-TV in Boston, with work ranging from presidential politics to biographies and musical history.

Career
Early in her career, Deane wrote and produced three episodes of the 13-part series Vietnam: A Television History with Stanley Karnow as chief correspondent. The three episodes were titled "America's Mandarin", "Homefront USA", and "The End of the Tunnel". Vietnam won a Peabody Award and seven Emmy awards. Originally broadcast in 1983, the program was re-broadcast by the PBS history series American Experience in 1997.

In 1985, Deane was senior producer for Frontline four-part series Crisis in Central America, which won a Peabody Award. She was senior producer for the 13-part series War and Peace in the Nuclear Age for WGBH in 1989.

In 1995, she was executive producer for the PBS series Rock & Roll, a co-production of WGBH and the BBC. The ten-part documentary series, with former New York Times music critic Robert Palmer as chief consultant, traced the history of rock music from the 1950s through the early 1990s. It won a Peabody Award and the American Society of Composers, Authors and Publishers Deems Taylor award for excellence in music programming. The program was also nominated for an Emmy. Under the BBC title of Dancing in the Street, the series was nominated for the BAFTA award.

Deane has produced many documentaries for the American Experience series including programs for its collection, The Presidents. She was executive producer for "Nixon" in 1990, and wrote, directed and produced Part II of the three-part series. "Nixon" was nominated for an Emmy that year and won a Writers Guild Award for Deane in 1991. She was executive producer for "The Kennedys" in 1992, which won the Best Documentary award from the British Broadcasting Press Guild in 1993. The Presidents series won a George Foster Peabody Award in 1997.

As part of her work for American Experience, Deane was executive producer for "The Rockefellers" in 2000, and wrote, directed and produced Part 1. She was executive producer of "Ulysses S. Grant", which aired in 2002. She also wrote, produced, and directed part two of "Ulysses S. Grant". Reconstruction: The Second Civil War followed in 2004. Deane was series producer for Reconstruction, and she wrote and produced part two of the series. Reconstruction gained a Writers Guild Award nomination for Deane. She was series producer and wrote "John & Abigail Adams" for The Presidents in 2006. "John & Abigail Adams" was also nominated for a Writers Guild Award.

In 2009, she was co-creator and executive producer of a second musical history for WGBH and the BBC, Latin Music USA. The four-part series documented music created by Latinos in the U.S. and was featured at the Aspen Ideas Festival.

Deane has also worked with WGBH's Media Library and Archives writing short essays featuring programming from the archives for the WGBH digital program guide. The essays are posted on Open Vault, the website of the WGBH archives.

Personal life
Raised in Coconut Grove and Coral Gables, Florida, Deane is an art history graduate of Wellesley College. She is married with two children and lives in Boston, Massachusetts.

See also
PBS
American Experience

References

External links

Living people
Year of birth missing (living people)
American women writers
American directors
PBS people
21st-century American women